Mitiny Derevenki is a rural locality (a village) in Gorod Vyazniki, Vyaznikovsky District, Vladimir Oblast, Russia. The population was 46 as of 2010.

Geography 
Mitiny Derevenki is located near the Klyazma River, 8 km northwest of Vyazniki (the district's administrative centre) by road. Seltsovy Derevenki is the nearest rural locality.

References 

Rural localities in Vyaznikovsky District